Alain Auderset is a Swiss Christian author of bandes dessinées (Franco-Belgian comics) and is best known for his comics albums Willy Grunch, Marcel, and ROBI.

Biography
Born on 27 October 1968 in Grenchen, Switzerland, Auderset was converted to Christianity after reading the French comic magazine Tournesol as a child. Later, passionate for drawing, he studied graphic arts and began to draw comic strips. In 2001 he released his first book, Conventional Wisdom, which has been translated into six additional languages (German, English, Portuguese, Spanish, Chinese and Danish) since it was originally published in French.

His books ROBI (2005) and Willy Grunch (2008) have both won the International Prize for French Language Christian Comics at the Angoulême International Comics Festival. Currently Auderset is self-publishing and claims he has sold approximately 110,000 copies of all his books.

Auderset is also a performance artist as well as a guitarist for the band Saahsal in which his wife Eliane is the lead singer. Since 2010 Auderset has been doing a stand-up comedy routine entitled "The Non-practicing Atheist," touring both in Europe and the Canadian province of Québec. During his last Québec tour in 2013 he was interviewed during a service at a church in Drummondville, QC, which was broadcast live through their website. He was also interviewed on CKZW radio in Montreal.

In 2012 Moondog Animation Studio in Charleston, South Carolina, raised US$117,534.00 through a crowd funding campaign on Kickstarter to produce five pilot episodes of The life and trials of Willy Grunch, based on Auderset's stories and art. The five pilots were completed and released in early 2013, and further episodes are slated to begin production in late 2016 as part of an additional Kickstarter project.

Currently Auderset lives in Saint-Imier with his wife and their four children.

Bibliography
 Alain Auderset, Idées reçues (Conventional Wisdom), Atelier Auderset, 2001
 Alain Auderset, Marcel Book 1, Atelier Auderset, 2004
 Alain Auderset, ROBI, Atelier Auderset, 2005
 Alain Auderset, Idées reçues II (Conventional Wisdom 2), Atelier Auderset, 2006
 Alain Auderset, Willy Grunch, Atelier Auderset, 2008
 Alain Auderset, Les vacances de Marcel (Marcel’s vacations – Marcel Book 2), Atelier Auderset, 2010
 Alain Auderset, Idées reçues III (Conventional Wisdom 3), Atelier Auderset, 2012
 Alain Auderset, Marcel Book 3, Atelier Auderset, 2014

Prizes
 Angoulême 2006: Special jury distinction for Idées reçues
 Angoulême 2007: International Prize for French Language Christian Comics for ROBI pour les intimes
 Albuquerque 2007 : ICCC2 People's Choice Awards – 1st, 3rd and 4th places
 Angoulême 2009: International Prize for French Language Christian Comics for Willy Grunch

References

External links
 Alain Auderset's website
 Migros Magazine (Switzerland) Alain Auderset: la foi qui déplace les bulles
 L'Est Républicain (France) La foi et l’optimisme

1968 births
Living people
Converts to Christianity
Swiss-French people
Swiss comics artists
Swiss Christians